Ignatius Ephrem Joseph III Yonan (or Younan, born November 15, 1944) is the Syriac Catholic Patriarch of Antioch and all the East of the Syriacs for the Syriac Catholic Church since his election on January 20, 2009.

Life
Ephrem Joseph Yonan was born at Hassaké, Syria, on November 15, 1944, and was ordained a priest on September 12, 1971. He served as director of the Seminary of Charfet for two years, as Director of Catechesis of the diocese of Hassaké for seven years and as pastor of the Church of the Annunciation in Beirut up to 1986.

In 1986 he was sent to the United States to establish missions for the Assyrian Catholic faithful. He founded a mission in Newark, New Jersey (Our Lady of Deliverance) and others in North Hollywood (Sacred Heart) in 1991 and in San Diego (Our Mother of Perpetual Help) in 1994.

On November 6, 1995, Pope John Paul II erected the Syrian Catholic Eparchy of Our Lady of Deliverance in Newark for all the Assyrian Catholics of the United States and Canada,  and appointed Ephrem Joseph Yonan as first eparch (bishop). He was thus consecrated bishop on January 7, 1996, by Ignatius Antony II Hayyek and served in the United States until his election as Primate and Patriarch of the Syriac Catholic Church on January 20, 2009. Pope Benedict XVI granted him ecclesiastical communion on January 22, 2009, in accordance with Canon 76 § 2 of the Code of Canons of the Eastern Churches.

Along with Cardinal Leonardo Sandri, Prefect of the Congregation for the Oriental Churches, Patriarch Ignatius Joseph III Yonan served as a co-president of the October 2010 Special Assembly of the Synod of Bishops for the Middle East in the Vatican.

Works
The patriarch has visited members of his flock in various areas of the diaspora, including Australia and the United States.

Yonan has been very active in the request for the beatification for Flavianus Michael Malke, who was beatified in 2015.

He has continuously called on Western countries to not support insurgents in Syria "just to make the regime of Assad fall" and to find another way to resolve the conflict. He has also condemned them for not caring enough about Middle Eastern Christians.

See also

 Dioceses of the Syrian Catholic Church
 List of Syriac Catholic Patriarchs of Antioch
 Lists of patriarchs, archbishops, and bishops

References

External links

  (German)

Positions

Syriac Catholic Patriarchs of Antioch
Assyrian/Syriac Syrians
People from Al-Hasakah
1944 births
Living people
20th-century Eastern Catholic bishops
21st-century Eastern Catholic bishops
Recipients of the Order of Saint Ignatius of Antioch